Kumutu may refer to

 Kumutu Hala, a Manchu clan, Manchuria, China
 Te Kumutu, part of the Ngāpuhi people of New Zealand